Nataša Janković (born 27 August 1991) is a Croatian female handballer for Molde Elite and the Croatian national team.

Janković played in her country for RK Lokomotiva Zagreb (2007–2015) before she moved to Turkey to play for the Rize-based team Ardeşen GSK in the Women's Super League.

References

Living people
1991 births
Handball players from Zagreb
Croatian female handball players
Croatian expatriate sportspeople in Turkey
Expatriate handball players in Turkey
Ardeşen GSK players